Birdsill Holly Jr. (November 8, 1820 – April 27, 1894) was an American mechanical engineer and inventor of water hydraulics devices. He is known for inventing mechanical devices that improved city water systems and patented an improved fire hydrant that is similar to those used currently for firefighting. Holly was a co-inventor of the Silsby steam fire engine. He founded the Holly Manufacturing Company that developed into the larger Holly Steam Combination Company that distributed heat from a central station and developed commercial district heating for cities in the United States and Canada.

Personal life

Birdsill Holly Jr. was born on November 8, 1820 in Auburn, New York. His father was Birdsill Holly, Sr. and his mother was Comfort (Parker) Holly. When Holly was born his father moved the family to Auburn to join the crew constructing the new prison facility. When the prison was completed, Birdsill Sr. found a job at the Auburn Theological Seminary in construction, after which he tried to farm without much success. The family moved to Seneca Falls, New York, where there was a water-powered industry with many jobs. Holly grew up in the Seneca Falls, New York, area since his father was able to find work as a millwright and general mechanic.

Holly was forced to drop out of school at the age of eight when his father died prematurely at the age of 37; he was only in the third grade before he had to start supporting his family. He was influenced by his father and took an interest in similar trade skills of mechanical engineering. Holly started an apprenticeship in a cabinetry before he trained as a mechanic. In his late teens Holly became a superintendent in the machine trade and later became an owner of a machine shop in Uniontown, Pennsylvania.

Holly divorced his wife Elizabeth sometime before 1870 and married his adopted daughter Sophia, twenty-eight years his junior. In a college thesis published in 1996 by Madelynn Frederickson The Life And Times Of Birdsill Holly she writes that the Lockport society shunned the couple, who moved away temporarily in hopes that the scandal would be forgotten.

Holly died in Lockport, New York, on April 27, 1894 at 7:00 pm at the age of 74. He suffered from a chronic illness and the cause of death was listed as heart failure.

Career 

Holly moved back to Seneca Falls in his early twenties and became one of the partners of a new firm called Silsby, Race and Holly in 1845. The firm manufactured hydraulic machinery and steam-powered fire engines. As the firm's visionary, Holly contributed significantly to their success. In 1849 he received his first patent, which was for a rotary water pump.

Holly was a co-inventor of the Silsby steam fire engine, which was first produced in 1856. More than 1,000 were made, becoming the most popular steam fire engine built in the United States. The unconventional rotary motion steam-cylinder engine and pump were Holly's inventions (US39259A and US12350A).

Holly left Seneca Falls in 1851 for Lockport where he established the Holly Manufacturing Company in 1859 with the financial assistance of politicians Washington Hunt and Thomas Flagler. The company produced sewing machines, cistern pumps, and rotary pumps. Holly built the Lockport Fire Protection and Water System in 1863, which used pumps powered by water turbines and steam engines to bring water to hydrants in the city. His system was adopted by Covington, Kentucky, in 1871. He patented a fire hydrant used for fire protection in 1869.

Holly's inventions used pressure to pump water directly into the main city water supply lines, since there were no water towers at the time for pressure from a local water supply reservoir for drinking water and fire protection. The pumps ran at various speeds according to usage and was regulated by the pressure in the discharge main. Holly's company facilities doubled when he built a similar system for the city of Lockport water works department. He applied his water works system equipment in more than two thousand cities in the United States and Canada.

Holly's system of pumping water into Lockport's city mains was unique. It not only supplied drinking water for domestic service, but also stored water under pressure for hydrants in a city fire protection service.  His technological innovations provided the impetus for similar city water works construction projects across the United States.

Holly's interests switched from fire protection systems to central heating. He wondered if there was a more efficient way to heat several nearby buildings rather than using individual small boilers in each building. He set up an experimental steam heating system at his home in Lockport in 1876. Through this wooden pipe he ran steam and found that there was little heat loss. He repeated the experiment with a 100-foot pipe to a neighbor's house. The experiment was successful and he convinced others of the possibility of wide-scale central steam heating.

Holly formed a company of investors interested in his steam concept of central heating with a capital of $25,000. He merged the new company with the Holly Manufacturing Company to establish the Holly Steam Combination Company in 1877. Its goals were to commercially distribute heat from a central station and develop district heating for towns and cities in Canada and the United States. Holly's district heating system used a large boiler at a central plant and provided steam to a group of town buildings in a surrounding city district through a circuit of insulated water pipes that distributed steam and returned it as water after being condensed. The pipes were insulated to reduce heat loss. The serviced buildings were metered with a steam quantity recorder invented by Holly. The consumer was charged for the heat consumed from the steam supply in accordance with coal comparison rates.

Holly designed and invented all the necessary control regulators and measuring devices to run a heating system for a city district. He patented 150 inventions in his lifetime.  He was a friend of inventor Thomas Edison, who asked Holly to become an assistant at his research laboratory in Menlo Park. Holly refused, as he wished to concentrate on his own businesses instead.

Unrealized plans 
Holly dreamed of constructing a nineteen-story skyscraper. He thought that Niagara Falls would become a tourist attraction someday, so he proposed the idea of building a  structure on Goat Island near the falls for viewing. The plan was never realized due to a lack of finances; he was unable to gather enough investors for such an expensive and highly speculative project. The concept of similar heights for skyscrapers became popular in New York City shortly before Holly's death in 1894, but did not originate from his architectural designs.

Works 
The following are some of his 150 patents:

 February 6, 1855  –  Elliptical or Rotary pump (US12350 A)
 July 3, 1855 – Method of regulating issue-apertures and of suspending turbine wheels (US13172 A)
 July 14, 1863 –  Improvement in pumps (US39259 A)
 November 15, 1864 – Improvement in pumps (US45040 A)
 January 31, 1865 – Hot air furnace (US46107 A)
 September 14, 1869 - Improvement in hydrants (US94749 A)
 November 5, 1872 –  Improvement in systems of water-supply for cities (USRE5133 E)
 October 5, 1880 – Steam Heating Radiator (US232821 A)

References

Sources

External links

Holly's patent fire hydrant
The Silsby engine – rotary steam engines
Jon Szpakowski's Hydrant Collection / Patent 1869 Holly Mfg. Co. Hydrant

1820 births
1894 deaths
19th-century American inventors
People from Auburn, New York
History of firefighting
People from Seneca Falls, New York